

Blues standards are blues songs that have attained a high level of recognition due to having been widely performed and recorded.  They represent the best known and most interpreted blues songs that are seen as standing the test of time.  Blues standards come from different eras and styles, such as ragtime-vaudeville, Delta and other early acoustic styles, and urban blues from Chicago and the West Coast.

Many blues songs were developed in American folk music traditions and individual songwriters are sometimes unidentified.  Blues historian Gerard Herzhaft noted:

Compounding the problem is that, in the earlier days, many blues songs were not copyrighted. Later, the rights were claimed by those who recorded a subsequent version or were managers or record company owners.

Nearly one half of the blues standards listed were first recorded in the pre-World War II acoustic blues era, before music publications tracked the sales of blues records. However, many popular renditions, as reflected in the record charts, are more modern versions featuring electric instruments. For example, Robert Johnson and Tampa Red, who were the first to record the most blues standards on the list at four each, performed them as solo or duo acoustic performances. However, B.B. King and Muddy Waters, with the most standards on the charts at five each, used electric blues-ensemble arrangements.

Music journalist Richie Unterberger commented on the adaptability of blues: "From its inception, the blues has always responded to developments in popular music as a whole: the use of guitar and piano in American folk and gospel, the percussive rhythms of jazz, the lyrics of Tin Pan Alley, and the widespread use of amplification and electric instruments all helped shape the evolution of the blues." Blues standards that appeared on the main charts in the 1960s and 1970s often had been recorded by rhythm and blues, soul, and rock musicians.  Each song listed has been identified by five or more music writers as a blues standard.  Spellings and titles may differ; the most common are used.

List

See also

Footnotes

References

Bibliography

 

Blues
Blues songs